Ernest Kockler (July 16, 1892 – September 20, 1970) was an American cyclist. He competed in two events at the 1920 Summer Olympics.

References

External links
 

1892 births
1970 deaths
American male cyclists
Olympic cyclists of the United States
Cyclists at the 1920 Summer Olympics
Cyclists from Chicago